The Type 61 25 mm AAA gun is an anti-aircraft gun produced and used by China. It is manually operated by a single crew with an optical sight. The development began in 1961 and the batch production began in 1966.  There were both land based and naval variants produced.

Users
Ship classes using the Type 61:

Beihai class gunboat
Type 010 minesweepers
Type 021-class missile boat
Type 024 missile boat
Type 037 corvette
Type 062 class gunboat
Type 648 repair ship
Type 067 landing craft utility
Type 072 landing ship
Type 074 landing ship
Type 074 landing ship medium
Type 073 landing ship medium
Type 079 landing ship medium

See also
M1940 (72-K) - The Type 61's Soviet predecessor.

References

External links
TYPE 61 (DUAL-25MM) SHIPBOARD ANTI-AIRCRAFT ARTILLERY

Naval anti-aircraft guns
Anti-aircraft guns of China
Autocannon
25 mm artillery
Naval weaponry of the People's Republic of China
Naval guns of China